The 2008 Turkish Super Cup was a football match between the Süper Lig champions Galatasaray, and the Turkish Cup winners Kayserispor. This was the third Super Cup match, played on 17 August 2008, in Duisburg, MSV-Arena. Galatasaray won the game 2–1 with goals of Harry Kewell and Shabani Nonda, while Mehmet Topuz scored a last minute goal for his side as a sign of Kayserispor's effort.

Match details

References

2008
Super Cup
20087
Turkish Super Cup 2008
Turkish Super Cup 2008